Janine O'Leary Cobb is a women's health activist and educator, and the author of one of the first popular books on menopause intended for a mainstream audience, Understanding Menopause (first published in 1988, now in its 6th edition, published 2005). Cobb is recognized widely as a pioneer in the women's health movement in North America and has won critical recognition for her work in the field.

In 1984 she founded the popular health newsletter, A Friend Indeed, dedicated to highlighting the increasing medicalization of menopause, and to breaking the taboo of silence that still hung over many important women's health issues, such as menstruation, menopause and breast cancer. The publication continued to be released bi-monthly under the stewardship of other editors until 2006.

Cobb was previously a professor with Vanier College, Montreal and is currently a board member with Breast Cancer Action Montreal. She is also a contributor to Our Bodies, Ourselves, the groundbreaking women's health collective. She lives in Montreal, Quebec, Canada.

References

External links

1933 births
Canadian health and wellness writers
Canadian feminists
Writers from Montreal
Canadian women non-fiction writers
Living people